Plerandra nono is a species of flowering plant in the family Araliaceae. It is endemic to New Caledonia.

References 

nono